Gerald Patrick D'Agostino (Marcy 29, 1924 – June 29, 1988) was an American football coach. He served as the head football coach at the State University of New York at Brockport from 1964 to 1973, comoiling a record of 31–48–1. D'Agostino died in 1988.

References

External links
 

1924 births
1988 deaths
Brockport Golden Eagles football coaches
High school football coaches in Texas
State University of New York at Brockport alumni
People from Port Washington, New York
Sportspeople from Nassau County, New York